Al-Najaf International Stadium is a newly built stadium in Najaf, Iraq, which was opened on 5 May 2018. It is used mostly for football matches and serves as the home stadium of Al-Najaf FC and Naft Al-Wasat SC. The stadium has a capacity of 30,000 spectators and the construction was at an overall cost of $83.75 million funded entirely by Iraqi government.

Design
The final design by Kansas City-based 360 Architecture has won the competition and was selected by Iraqi Ministry of Youth and Sports. The first proposed design was to include an athletics track but it was agreed to remove it in order to achieve a football specific stadium. The sports complex also contains two additional stadiums with 400 and 2000 spectators respectively, mainly used for training. The religious ornaments and mosaics on the outer facade are inspired by Imam Ali's mosque which is 10 km away from the stadium.

Prix Versailles 2019
Al Najaf International Stadium has been nominated among five other finalists to win the 2019 Prix Versailles for the most beautiful sporting facility in the world (architecture and design). The committee considered various criteria including innovation, creativeness, attention to landscaping, recognition of local, natural and cultural patrimony, and environmental efficiency. The importance of social interaction and participation were also part of the assessment criteria.

See also 
List of football stadiums in Iraq

References

Football venues in Iraq
Sports venues completed in 2018
2018 establishments in Iraq
Najaf